California Preparatory College is a private, non-denominational Christian community college founded in 2007 in Redlands, California, United States.

California Preparatory College is located at 1250 E. Cooley Drive, Colton, CA 92324. Phone 909.370.4800.

References

External links
Official website

Nondenominational Christian universities and colleges in the United States
Educational institutions established in 2007
Unaccredited Christian universities and colleges in the United States
Unaccredited institutions of higher learning in California
2007 establishments in California